In computer science and quantum physics, the Church–Turing–Deutsch principle (CTD principle) is a stronger, physical form of the Church–Turing thesis formulated by David Deutsch in 1985. The principle states that a universal computing device can simulate every physical process.

History
The principle was stated by Deutsch in 1985 with respect to finitary machines and processes. He observed that classical physics, which makes use of the concept of real numbers, cannot be simulated by a Turing machine, which can only represent computable reals. Deutsch proposed that quantum computers may actually obey the CTD principle, assuming that the laws of quantum physics can completely describe every physical process.

An earlier version of this thesis for classical computers was stated by Alan Turing's friend and student Robin Gandy in 1980.

See also
 Bekenstein bound
 Digital physics
 Holographic principle 
 Quantum complexity theory

Notes

References

Further reading

 Christopher G. Timpson Quantum Computers: the Church-Turing Hypothesis Versus the Turing Principle in Christof Teuscher, Douglas Hofstadter (eds.) Alan Turing: life and legacy of a great thinker, Springer, 2004, pp. 213–240

External links

Alan Turing
Principles
Computability theory
Theory of computation